WYCW (channel 62) is a television station licensed to Asheville, North Carolina, United States, serving as the CW outlet for Western North Carolina and Upstate South Carolina. It is owned and operated by network majority owner Nexstar Media Group alongside Spartanburg, South Carolina–licensed CBS affiliate WSPA-TV (channel 7). WYCW and WSPA-TV share studios on International Drive (next to the I-26 and I-85 Business/Veterans Parkway interchange) in Spartanburg; through a channel sharing agreement, the two stations transmit using WSPA-TV's spectrum from an antenna on Hogback Mountain in northeastern Greenville County (southwest of Tryon, North Carolina).

History

Prior use of channel 62 in Asheville

Asheville's first television station, WISE-TV, began broadcasting on channel 62 on August 2, 1953. It was a primary NBC affiliate which also carried programs from ABC, CBS, and DuMont. ABC and DuMont moved to WLOS (channel 13) when that station signed on in September 1954. In 1967, the station changed its call letters to WANC; the next year, it dropped its remaining NBC programming as its ownership brought a cable system to Asheville. WANC-TV moved from channel 62 to 21 in 1971, airing a limited amount of Christian television programming throughout the 1970s by simulcasting WGGS-TV (channel 16) in Greenville. Pappas Telecasting acquired WANC-TV in 1979, took it silent, and returned it to the air as WHNS on April 1, 1984.

Current allocation
Channel 62 returned to the air on October 31, 1984, as WASV-TV. Originally locally owned, even though it was licensed as a full-power outlet, the station initially operated at low-power, simulcasting WGGS-TV. This was necessary in the days before cable gained much penetration in this vast market, much of which is very mountainous. WASV began to run infomercials and shop-at-home programming in the early 1990s.

It was sold to Pappas Telecasting (which previously owned WHNS) in 1995 and began to transmit its analog signal at full-power in 1996. At that time, Pappas entered into a local marketing agreement with CBS affiliate WSPA-TV (channel 7), which took control of WASV's programming and airtime. In October 1997, WASV became the market's WB affiliate, taking the affiliation from WSPA, which carried the network on a secondary basis beginning at the network's launch in January 1995. At the same time, the station also became a secondary affiliate of UPN. The station branded on-air as "The New 62" from 1997 to 2002, which was then changed to "Super 62" in 2002, lasting until early 2004. From 1998 to 2000, WASV aired sporting events from CBS and NBC that those networks' local affiliates WSPA and WYFF (channel 4) preempted in favor of local programming, breaking news or severe weather coverage, or annual telethons.

The WB affiliation moved to rival WBSC (channel 40, now WMYA-TV) on September 6, 1999 and WASV became a full-time UPN station, branding as "UPN 62." WASV continued its LMA with WSPA even after the latter station was sold to Media General in 2000. Channel 62 was purchased by Media General outright in 2002, creating the market's first television duopoly. From 1997 to 1998, WASV signed off nightly from around midnight until 7:00 a.m. Later in 1998, it began broadcasting 24 hours a day with the addition of a block of programming from the Shop at Home Network during the overnight hours. In late-2005/early 2006, the station dropped Shop at Home programming, and replaced it with a mix of off-network sitcoms and court shows in the overnight during the week, and off-network dramas and sitcoms as well as movies on weekends.

On January 24, 2006, the Warner Bros. unit of Time Warner and CBS Corporation announced that the two companies would shut down The WB and UPN and combine the networks' respective programming to create a new "fifth" network called The CW. On March 2, 2006, Sinclair Broadcast Group announced that WBSC would become an affiliate of another new network, MyNetworkTV, which launched on September 5. Nearly four weeks later on March 28, it was confirmed WASV would join The CW.

Corresponding with the upcoming network change, the station officially changed its call letters to WYCW on April 22, 2006. However, it continued to use the WASV call sign on-air until UPN officially ceased operations on September 15, 2006. When The CW launched on September 18, the station rebranded itself as "Carolinas CW". In recent years, WYCW has been carried on cable in portions of the Columbia, South Carolina market, as well in the South Carolina side of the Augusta, Georgia market (including Aiken and North Augusta).

On September 8, 2015, Media General announced that it would acquire the Meredith Corporation, owner of WHNS, for $2.4 billion to form Meredith Media General. Since WSPA and WHNS were among the four highest-rated stations in the market in total day viewership, the merged company would have been required to sell either WSPA or WHNS to comply with FCC ownership rules as well as recent changes to those rules regarding same-market television stations that restrict sharing agreements. WYCW was the only one of the three stations affected by the merger that could have been legally acquired by Meredith Media General either by maintaining the existing duopoly with WSPA or by forming a new duopoly with WHNS, as its total day viewership ranks below the top-four ratings threshold. That sale was canceled on January 27, 2016, in favor of a sale of Media General to the Nexstar Broadcasting Group, and WSPA and WYCW became part of "Nexstar Media Group." The deal was approved by the FCC on January 11, 2017, and it was completed on January 17.

Programming
Syndicated programs broadcast by WYCW include The People's Court, Dateline, Seinfeld, The Goldbergs, and The Andy Griffith Show, among others. WYCW also carries the second half-hour of CBS' political discussion program Face the Nation on Sunday mornings at 11:00 a.m., as WSPA only clears the first half-hour of the program (which airs in the half-hour prior to the airing of the second half of the program on channel 62).

Newscasts
WSPA-TV presently produces 16 hours of locally produced newscasts each week for WYCW (with three hours each weekday and a half-hour each on Saturdays and Sundays). Since the early 2000s, WSPA has produced a nightly prime time newscast for WYCW, currently known as 7 News at 10 on CW 62. The newscast, which airs for an hour on weeknights and a half-hour on weekends, competes with an hour-long in-house newscast seen on Fox affiliate WHNS and a half-hour newscast on MyNetworkTV affiliate WMYA (the latter of which is produced by WLOS). In the late 2000s, WSPA also began producing a two-hour extension of WSPA's weekday morning newscast for WYCW. Currently known as 7 News Daybreak on CW 62, the program airs from 7:00 to 9:00 a.m. and competes against the in-house morning newscast on WHNS.

On September 16, 2007, WSPA became the first television station in the Greenville/Spartanburg/Asheville market to begin broadcasting its newscasts to high-definition; the WYCW newscasts were included in the upgrade, which introduced a graphics package similar to that used at the time by Media General flagship WFLA-TV in Tampa, Florida. In 2008, news anchor Amy Wood launched the "CW Live Chat" feature during the weeknight edition of the 10:00 p.m. newscast. At the time, it was one of the first interactive live broadcasts in the United States, with an anchor hosting the chat live while simultaneously anchoring on-air.

In addition to the main studios in Spartanburg, WSPA/WYCW opened a street front studio in downtown Greenville in January 2017. Known as "7 On Main", the studio is located at the corner of Main Street and Falls Park Drive. The stations also operate a news bureau on Main Street/SC 28 in Anderson. Nexstar maintains a Capitol bureau in Columbia, covering state government issues for the company's South Carolina stations.

Technical information

Subchannels
The station's digital signal is multiplexed:

On March 1, 2009, WYCW began carrying sister station WSPA-TV on a second digital subchannel, due to the collapse of channel 7's broadcast tower on Hogback Mountain (southwest of Tryon, North Carolina).

On February 2, 2016, WYCW began carrying GetTV on 62.3. In early February 2021, True Crime Network replaced Get TV on 62.3, only for that to be replaced by Rewind TV on October 20, 2022.

Analog-to-digital conversion
WYCW discontinued regular programming on its analog signal, over UHF channel 62, on February 17, 2009, the original target date in which full-power television stations in the United States were to transition from analog to digital broadcasts under federal mandate (which was later pushed back to June 12, 2009). The station's digital signal remained on its pre-transition UHF channel 45. Through the use of PSIP, digital television receivers display the station's virtual channel as its former UHF analog channel 62, which was among the high band UHF channels (52-69) that were removed from broadcasting use as a result of the transition.

As part of the SAFER Act, WYCW kept its analog signal on the air until March 3 to inform viewers of the digital television transition through a loop of public service announcements from the National Association of Broadcasters.

Spectrum share with WSPA-TV
On April 13, 2017, the FCC identified WYCW will be compensated $45.6 million to have its digital channel 45 go off-the-air as part of the spectrum auction. On April 1, 2018, WYCW moved their digital broadcasts to subchannels of WSPA-TV while retaining channel 62 as their virtual channel. WYCW did not have to change its city of license, as WSPA's over-the-air signal completely covers Asheville.

References

External links
WYCW ("Carolinas CW") official website
WSPA-TV ("7 On Your Side") official website

Television channels and stations established in 1984
YCW
The CW affiliates
Rewind TV affiliates
Nexstar Media Group
1984 establishments in North Carolina